This is a list of diplomatic missions of Japan. Japan sent ambassadors to the Tang Chinese court in Xi'an since 607 AD, as well as to the Koryo and Joseon dynasties of early Korea. For centuries, early modern Japan did not actively seek to expand its foreign relations. The first Japanese ambassadors to a Western country travelled to Spain in 1613. Japan did not open an embassy in the United States (in Washington, D.C.) until 1860.

Honorary consulates are excluded from this listing.

Current missions

Africa

Americas

Asia

Europe

Oceania

Multilateral organisations

Gallery

Embassies to open

Closed missions

Africa

Americas

Asia

Europe

Oceania

See also 
 Foreign relations of Japan
 List of diplomatic missions in Japan
 Visa policy of Japan

Notes

References 

 "Embassies, Consulates, Permanent Missions Overseas", Ministry of Foreign Affairs, retrieved August 22, 2006
 "Inn California" by Sebastian Vizcaino, Inn California, retrieved August 22, 2006
 "History of Japan", Historyworld, retrieved August 22, 2006

External links 

 The Ministry of Foreign Affairs of Japan
 mofa.go.jp

 
Miss
Japan